Xu Ningsheng (born 7 July 1957) is a Chinese physicist who served as president of Fudan University from 2014 to 2021 and president of Sun Yat-sen University from 2010 to 2014. He is an academician of the Chinese Academy of Sciences and The World Academy of Sciences.

Biography
Xu was born in Zhanlong Town of Puning, Guangdong province, on July 7, 1957, with his ancestral home in Chenghai District, Shantou. Xu secondary studied at Xingwen High School.

He was a sent-down youth from 1975 to 1978, during the Cultural Revolution.

After the Resumption of University Entrance Examination in 1977, he studied, then taught, at the Department of Physics of Sun Yat-sen University, in Guangzhou. He received his doctor's degree from Aston University in 1986, and taught at the university for 10 years afterwards.

He was honored as a Distinguished Young Scholar by the National Science Fund for Distinguished Young Scholars in 1995.

In 1996 and that year, he returned to China and became professor of physics at Sun Yat-sen University, becoming Dean of its School of Physics and Engineering in 1999, and was promoted to Vice-President in 2004. He also served as Dean of International Exchange College between 2004 and 2008.

He was elected a fellow of the Institute of Physics in 1998. He was named a Chang Jiang Scholar by the Ministry of Education of China in 1999.

In December 2010, he was appointed President of Sun Yat-sen University. In October 2014 he was appointed President of Fudan University.

References

1957 births
Living people
Alumni of Aston University
Educators from Guangdong
Fellows of the Institute of Physics
Members of the Chinese Academy of Sciences
People from Shantou
Physicists from Guangdong
Presidents of Fudan University
Presidents of Sun Yat-sen University
Sun Yat-sen University alumni
TWAS fellows